The Taiwan External Trade Development Council (TAITRA) is a non-profit government co-sponsored trade promotion organization in Taiwan.

It was founded in 1970 as China External Trade Development Council (CETRA). However, it changed its English name in January 2004. This was in order to avoid confusion with bodies representing the People's Republic of China.

TAITRA assists Taiwan businesses and manufacturers to reinforce their international competitiveness and to cope with the challenges they face in foreign markets.

Cooperating with Far East Trade Services, Inc. (FETS) and the Taipei World Trade Center (TWTC), its sister organizations, TAITRA has striven to adapt its trade promotion strategies to the changing international conditions.

Its major functions include: Market Research & Information Service, Market Development, Exhibition & Convention Service, Trade Education and Web Service.

Organizational structure
 Board of Directors
 Chairman
 Auditing Office
 Deputy Chairman
 President and CEO
 Research and Evaluation Committee
 Executive Vice Presidents
 Market Development Department
 Market Research Department
 Trade Net Center
 International Trade Institute
 Planning and Finance Department
 4 Domestic Branch Offices
 60 Overseas Branch Offices and 8 Points of Contact in Mainland China
 Strategic Marketing Department
 Service Industry Promotion Center
 Exhibition Department
 Taipei International Exhibition Center
 Nangang International Exhibition Center
 Taipei International Convention Center
 General Administration Department

Offices

Over the past decades, TAITRA has developed trade promotion, and it has an information network consisting of trained specialists stationed in offices worldwide:

See also
 Taipei World Trade Center
 Taipei Nangang Exhibition Center
 Hong Kong Trade Development Council

References

External links 

TAITRA
Taiwan Trade Shows
Taiwantrade
Taiwan Products Magazine

1970 establishments in Taiwan
Foreign trade of Taiwan
Non-profit organizations based in Taiwan
Organizations based in Taipei
Organizations established in 1970